Nicolás de Ribera, El Viejo (Olvera, Spain, 1487 – Lima, 1563) was a Spanish conquistador and the first mayor of Lima.

References

See also
Famous Thirteen

Mayors of Lima
1563 deaths
Year of birth unknown
1487 births